Loredana Nusciak (born Loredana Cappelletti; 3 May 1942 – 12 July 2006) was an Italian actress and model.

Biography
Born in Trieste, she won the beauty contest "Miss Trieste" in 1959, while still a high school student. After making her film debut in A Difficult Life (1961), Nusciak achieved some popularity in the sixties thanks to her roles in a number of genre films,  including L'uomo che viene da Canyon City (1965) and Django (1966); starting from seventies, she thinned out her acting activity, appearing in just four more films. She was also very active in fotonovelas. She was also March in the 1963 Lambretta catalogue.

Death
Nusciak died of an incurable disease in her hometown of Trieste in 2006, and was survived by her husband, former actor Gianni Medici.

Partial filmography

Colossus and the Amazon Queen (1960) - Amazzone
Sanremo - La grande sfida (1960)
Totòtruffa 62 (1961) - College Girl
A Difficult Life (1961) - Giovanna, Elena's friend
Smog (1962)
Gladiators 7 (1962) - Aglaia
I motorizzati (1962) - Paola
The Fall of Rome (1963) - Svetla
La banda Casaroli (1963)
Siamo tutti pomicioni (1963) - Lucienne (segment "Le gioie della vita") 
Les Baisers (1964) - Gina (episode 4 "Baiser de 16 ans")
Seven from Thebes (1964) - Cirene
Här kommer bärsärkarna (1965) - Veronica
The Dreamer (1965) - Donata
Man from Canyon City (1965) - Viviane Barrett
Z7 Operation Rembrandt (1966) - Paula
Seven Dollars on the Red (1966) - Emily
Django (1966) - Maria
Superargo contro Diabolikus (1966) - Diabolikus' Girlfriend
Ten Thousand Dollars for a Massacre (1967) - Mijanou
Tiffany Memorandum (1967) - The Shadow's Agent
Revenge for Revenge (1968) - Clara / Ann Bower
Dio perdoni la mia pistola (1969) - Gladys Clanton
Something Creeping in The Dark (1971) - Model for Photo of Lady Sheila Marlowe
Tony Arzenta (1973) - Gesmundo's Lover
Silent Action (1975) - Mrs. Martinetti (uncredited)
Folle à tuer (1975) - Marcella Mostri
Ancora una volta... a Venezia (1975) - Franca

References

External links

1942 births
2006 deaths
Italian film actresses
Spaghetti Western actresses
20th-century Italian actresses